Princesa do Sul Futebol Clube, commonly known as Princesa do Sul, is a Brazilian football club based in Floriano, Piauí state.

History
The club was founded on December 1, 2001.

Stadium
Princesa do Sul Futebol Clube play their home games at Estádio Tibério Barbosa Nunes, nicknamed Tiberão. The stadium has a maximum capacity of 4,500 people.

References

Association football clubs established in 2001
Football clubs in Piauí
2001 establishments in Brazil